This is a list of defunct airlines of Benin.

See also

 List of airlines of Benin
 List of airports in Benin

References

Benin
Airlines
Airlines, defunct